The Leone class were a group of destroyers built for the Italian Navy in the early 1920s. Five ships were planned and three completed. All three ships were based at Massawa, Eritrea during World War II and were sunk during the East African Campaign.

Design and description
The ships were designed as scout cruisers (esploratori), essentially enlarged versions of contemporary destroyers. They were initially ordered in 1917, but postponed due to steel shortages, and re-ordered in 1920. Their complement was 10 officers and 194 enlisted men.

The Leones were powered by two Parsons geared steam turbines, each driving one propeller shaft using steam supplied by four Yarrow boilers.

Their main battery consisted of eight  guns in four twin-gun turrets, one each fore and aft of the superstructure and the remaining turrets positioned between the funnels and the torpedo tube mounts amidships. Anti-aircraft (AA) defense for the Leone-class ships was provided by a pair of  AA guns in single mounts amidships. They were equipped with six  torpedo tubes in two triple mounts. The Leones could also carry 60 mines.

Operational history
The ships were outfitted for colonial service, and by 1935 they were deployed in the naval base of Massawa, Eritrea. The ships were re-rated as destroyers in 1938 and fought in World War II, when the Italian entry in the war left Italian East Africa isolated from Italy.

Attack on convoy BN 7

The only appreciable action in which the destroyers were involved was the attack on the Allied convoy BN 7, in the early hours of 21 October 1940. The attack was nevertheless repulsed by the cruiser HMS Leander, which fired 129 six-inch rounds on the Italian destroyers. Kimberley took two hits on a boiler from coastal batteries, and had to be towed to Aden by HMS Leander.

Last mission
The destroyers remained at dock in Massawa until the very end of ground operations in East Africa. Their commander ordered them to steam out on 31 March 1941, for a naval bombardment against targets around the Suez canal, in a mission without return. Leone ran aground off Massawa, and was then destroyed by her sister ships. After being spotted and harassed by British aircraft, Pantera and Tigre reached the Arabian shores, where their crews scuttled them.

Ships

Two more ships Lince and Leopardo were cancelled in 1920 or 1921.

Notes

Bibliography

Further reading

External links
 Classe Leone Marina Militare website

 
Destroyer classes
Destroyers of the Regia Marina
Ships built in Italy
Ships built by Gio. Ansaldo & C.